John Fitzhardinge Paul Butler  (20 December 1888 – 5 September 1916) was a British Army officer during the First World War and an English recipient of the Victoria Cross, the highest award for gallantry in the face of the enemy that can be awarded to British and Commonwealth forces.

Background
Butler was born in Berkeley, Gloucestershire, on 20 December 1888 to Lieutenant Colonel Francis John Paul Butler and the Hon. Elspeth Butler (née Gifford), daughter of Robert Gifford, 2nd Baron Gifford. Butler was thus the nephew of fellow Victoria Cross recipient Edric Gifford, 3rd Baron Gifford.

In February 1907, Butler was commissioned into the King's Royal Rifle Corps. He was married, to Alice Amelia of Portfield, Chichester.

Military career
Butlerwas 25 years old, and a lieutenant in The King's Royal Rifle Corps, attached to Pioneer Company, Gold Coast Regiment, West African Frontier Force, and was awarded the Victoria Cross for his actions on 17 November 1914 in the Cameroons, Nigeria.

Citation

He was awarded the DSO the following year. He later achieved the rank of captain, and was killed in action at Motomba on 5 September 1916.

Medal
His medal is displayed at the Royal Green Jackets (Rifles) Museum in Winchester.

References

Monuments to Courage (David Harvey, 1999)
The Register of the Victoria Cross (This England, 1997)
VCs of the First World War: 1914 (Gerald Gliddon, 1994)

1888 births
1916 deaths
British World War I recipients of the Victoria Cross
British Army personnel of World War I
Companions of the Distinguished Service Order
King's Royal Rifle Corps officers
British military personnel killed in World War I
Royal West African Frontier Force officers
People from Berkeley, Gloucestershire
British Army recipients of the Victoria Cross
Military personnel from Gloucestershire